Many Zimbabwean museums are administered by the National Museums and Monuments of Zimbabwe (a Zimbabwean government parastatal). They all open between 9:00 AM and 5:00 PM and are open every day except on Good Friday and Christmas Day. They are open to everyone, and a fee may be charged depending with whether you are a local resident or a non-resident and on whether you are a child or an adult. Below is a list of museums in Zimbabwe.

List

See also 
 List of museums

References

External links 
 Museums in Zimbabwe

 
Zimbabwe
Museums
Museums
Museums
Zimbabwe